A digital architect is a person who designs business processes to improve customer experience, increase profitability, and improve competitive position. Digital architects focus on: (1) customer experience; (2) cloud, webscale, iot; (3) data science including analytics; (4) business, application, information, technology and security architecture; (5) artificial intelligence, cognitive science, neuroscience, robotics and artificial creativity;  (6) traditional science and mathematics including physics, quantum physics, chemistry and biology; and (7) digital 3D printing and nano-manufacturing (source of definition: Gary Trenchard).

The business case for a digital architect role within enterprise:

References

Computing and society